Ctenopharynx pictus is a species of fish in the family Cichlidae. It is restricted to Lake Malawi. It is a mouthbrooder, but the female will often release the young near nesting kampango catfish. Their young are then brought up together.

References

pictus
Taxa named by Ethelwynn Trewavas
Fish described in 1935
Taxonomy articles created by Polbot